Lansargues is a commune in the Hérault département in the Occitanie region in southern France.

Population

See also
Communes of the Hérault department

References

Communes of Hérault